Silas L. Warner (1924–1993) entered Princeton University from Choate Rosemary Hall in June 1942, and graduated in 1945 after his first year at Northwestern Medical School. As a student he wrestled and played varsity soccer, football, tennis and hockey.
His internship and residency were done at Menninger School of Psychiatry. Warner had a consulting relationship with Swarthmore College while being senior attending psychiatrist at Pennsylvania Hospital in Philadelphia.
His first marriage, (1950–62) to Lee Drummond, and then 1963 Silas wed Libby Severinghaus Dingle.

A dedicated researcher and writer, Silas co-authored a major work on personality disorders. His other published works dealt with how preschool children learn, and the relationship between truth, reality, lies and delusions. Among his written articles was a major feature in "The New York Times" on cocaine use in professional sports. Shortly after his death in San Francisco on November 20, 1993, a paper of his was presented to the American Psychological Association (APA) which dealt with the life and career of Dr. Joseph Cheesman Thompson, a psychoanalyst who had had considerable influence on the founder of Dianetics.

Some Published Works

Your Child Learns Naturally (with Edward B. Rosenberg)
The Psychotic Personality (with Leon Joseph Saul)
Freud and the Mighty Warrior
Dreams in New Perspective: The Royal Road Revisited

References

1. Princeton Alumni Weekly 

1924 births
1993 deaths
American psychiatrists
American medical writers
Princeton University alumni
20th-century American non-fiction writers
20th-century American male writers
American male non-fiction writers